Ulluchara is a rural locality (a selo) in Akushinsky District, Republic of Dagestan, Russia. The population was 392 as of 2010. There are 15 streets.

Geography 
Ulluchara is located 15 km southwest of Akusha (the district's administrative centre) by road. Gapshima is the nearest rural locality.

References 

Rural localities in Akushinsky District